The 1926–27 season was the 29th in the history of the Southern League. The league consisted of Eastern and Western Divisions. Brighton & Hove Albion II won the Eastern Division and Torquay United won the Western Division. Brighton reserves were declared Southern League champions after defeating Torquay 4–0 in a championship play-off.

Four clubs from the Southern League applied to join the Football League, with Torquay being successful in a second round of voting. Five clubs (all reserve teams) left the league at the end of the season.

Eastern Division

A total of 17 teams contest the division, including 15 sides from previous season and two new teams.

Newly elected teams:
 Dartford
 Poole

Western Division

A total of 14 teams contest the division, including 13 sides from previous season and one new team.

Newly elected teams:
 Newport County II

Football League election
Four Southern League clubs applied to join the Football League this season, entering the ballot alongside the bottom two from the Third Division South. Although Watford were re-elected, Aberdare Athletic received the same number of votes as Southern League Torquay United, leading to a second round, in which Torquay won more votes. Aberdare took Torquay's place in the Southern League the following season.

Aberdare's loss was controversial, as one ballot paper in the first round had been spoilt and Aberdare's secretary claimed that one of the scrutineers was 'an interested party'.

References

1926-27
4
1926–27 in Welsh football